Alexander Dow (1735/6, Perthshire, Scotland – 31 July 1779, Bhagalpur) was a Scottish Orientalist, writer, playwright and army officer in the East India Company.

Life

He was a native of Crieff, Perthshire. Alexander Dow's father worked at the Customs at Dunbar. The younger Dow was educated in Dunbar for a time, and, in conjunction with his father's job, this would suggest that he lived in the area for a time. Dow was in the process of being educated for a mercantile career in Eyemouth, when he abruptly left aboard the King of Prussia as a midshipman. The reason for this turn of events is not known, but one reason posited for this was that he was involved in a fatal duel. Dow then worked his way to Bencoolen. There he became secretary to the Governor, and was commended to the patronage of the officials of the East India Company at Calcutta. He joined the army there as an ensign in the Bengal infantry on 14 September 1760, and was rapidly promoted lieutenant on 23 August 1763, and captain on 16 April 1764.

He returned to Britain on leave in 1768, and published in that year two translations, Tales translated from the Persian of Inatulla of Delhi and the History of Hindostan, translated from the Persian of Ferishta, from Firishta.  Both works had a great success, and in the following year Dow had a five-act tragedy on Genghis Khan, Zingis, which was acted with some success at Drury Lane.

He then returned to India, and was promoted lieutenant-colonel on 25 February 1769, and in 1772 published the continuation of his history of Hindostan to the death of Aurungzeb, with two dissertations, 'On the Origin and Nature of Despotism in Hindostan,’ and 'An Enquiry into the State of Bengal.' In 1774 he again returned to England, and David Garrick produced his second tragedy in verse at Drury Lane, entitled 'Sethona', set in a mythic ancient Egypt. It was acted only for nine nights, and was said by David Erskine Baker in his Biographia Dramatica to be not really by Dow at all.

Dow returned once more to India, and died at Bhágalpur on 31 July 1779.

Works
Tales Translated from the Persian of Inatulla of Delhi (1768)
Zingis (1769) - 5-act tragedy
Sethona (1774) - verse tragedy

References

External links

Persian Tales of Inatulla of Delhi in anthology work, Tales of the East: Continuationof the New Arabian nights. Persian tales [from the translation of F. Pétis de la Croix] Persian tales of Inatulla of Delhi [tr. by A. Dow] Oriental tales [by A. C. P., comte de Caylus] The history of Nourjahad [by Mrs. Frances Sheridan] Additional tales from the Arabian nights, J. Ballantyne and company, 1812, at Google Books
 Sethona. A Tragedy at Google Books

1730s births
1779 deaths
Scottish military personnel
Scottish orientalists
British East India Company Army officers
Scottish translators
Scottish dramatists and playwrights
18th-century British translators